Aleshki is a rural locality (a village) in Florishchinskoye Rural Settlement, Kolchuginsky District, Vladimir Oblast, Russia. The population was 4 as of 2010.

Geography 
Aleshki is located on the Shorna River, 22 km west of Kolchugino (the district's administrative centre) by road. Dyakonovo is the nearest rural locality.

References 

Rural localities in Kolchuginsky District